"Mycolicibacter virginiensis" (formerly Mycobacterium virginiense) is a species of bacteria from the phylum Actinomycetota. It is susceptible to clarithromycin, ethambutol, rifabutin, and TMP-SMX. It has been isolated from cases of tenosynovitis, swine farm mud, bovine feces, sputum, and diseased dromedaries.

References

Acid-fast bacilli
virginiensis
Bacteria described in 2017